The Trip is the debut solo album by French indie musician Lætitia Sadier, known as member of Stereolab and her side project Monade. The album was recorded in 2010 and was released in September of the same year.

Beside nine original compositions by Sadier, the record contains three covers: "By the Sea", originally performed by Wendy and Bonnie, "Un Soir, Un Chien", written by Fred Chichin and Catherine Ringer of Les Rita Mitsouko and the standard "Summertime", composed by George Gershwin and DuBose Heyward.

The record is dedicated to Sadier's sister Noelle, who had committed suicide a short time before the album's recording.

The album was received well by critics, earning an 8.2 out of 10 rating by Pitchfork Media and a 3.5 out of 5 rating by Allmusic.

Track listing
All songs written by Lætitia Sadier, except where noted.

Side one
 "One Million Year Trip" – 5:02
 "Fluid Sand" – 4:33
 "Our Interests Are the Same" – 0:10
 "Natural Child" – 4:00
 "Statues Can Bend" – 2:57
 "By the Sea" (Wendy and Bonnie)  - 3:45

Side two
 "Unfasten" – 0:24
 "Un Soir, Un Chien" (Catherine Ringer, Fred Chichin)  – 4:50
 "Another Monster" – 2:49
 "Ceci est le coeur" – 3:20
 "Summertime" (George Gershwin, DuBose Heyward)  - 1:59
 "Release, Open Your Little Earthling Hands" - 0:29

Personnel
Lætitia Sadier - vocals, guitar, bass on track 12
 Julien Gasc - bass, acoustic guitar, piano prepare, keyboards, incidental noises, vocals
 Emma Mario - drums, percussion, electronics, vocals
 April March - additional vocals
Richard Swift - drums, keyboards, subtle electronics, vocals
 Yuuki Matthews - bass, vocals, acoustic guitar on track 1
 Rebecca Gates - additional vocals
Recorded and engineered by Emma Mario
Produced and mixed by Mario/Sadier

Notes

2010 debut albums
Lætitia Sadier albums
Drag City (record label) albums